Kfar Bialik is a moshav in northern Israel. Located near Kiryat Bialik, it falls under the jurisdiction of Zevulun Regional Council.

History
The village was founded in 1934 on land owned by the Jewish National Fund by Jewish immigrants from Germany. It was named after Hayyim Nahman Bialik, who died the month before the moshav's establishment.

Notable residents
Eyal Eizenberg
Uri Sagi

References

External links
Official website

German-Jewish culture in Israel
Moshavim
Populated places established in 1934
1934 establishments in Mandatory Palestine
Populated places in Haifa District